The Huys Dever is a small castle in Lisse, Netherlands. It was probably built shortly after 1375 by Reinier Dever or d'Ever, a member of an old noble family from Holland.

History

The castle was a typical stronghold that was at one time situated on the edge of a lake called the Lisser Poel (since poldered in) that itself was in connection to the Haarlemmermeer (itself a polder since in 1853). In 1630 a stately home was built on to the tower and became a summer residence, but after the Haarlem Lake was poldered in the 19th century it fell into disuse and became a ruin. In 1973 restoration began and the roof was built in the manner of 16th century carpentry.

Building today
The building houses a small archeological museum with finds dug up in the former moat around the building. It has been voted a very important rijksmonument for its early medieval remains. The building is open to visitors Wednesday-Sunday 14:00-17:00, and can be rented for events.

References

External links 
 

Castles in South Holland
Museums in South Holland
Rijksmonuments in South Holland
Lisse